Nuno Miguel Machado Silva Pereira (born 4 December 1996) is a Portuguese footballer who plays for SC Ideal as a goalkeeper.

Football career
On 27 January 2016, Pereira made his professional debut with Leixões in a 2015–16 Taça da Liga match against Belenenses.

References

External links

Stats and profile at LPFP 

1996 births
Living people
Portuguese footballers
Association football goalkeepers
Liga Portugal 2 players
Campeonato de Portugal (league) players
Leixões S.C. players
C.D. Cinfães players
C.D. Fátima players
Footballers from Porto